Stella Sigurðardóttir (born 30 March 1990) is an Icelandic former team handball player. She played on the Icelandic national team, and participated at the 2011 World Women's Handball Championship in Brazil.

In the 2010 Úrvalsdeild kvenna playoffs, Stella suffered a blow to her temple and was knocked out. In November 2013, Stella suffered a blow to her left temple, in a game with the national team, that resulted in a concussion, memory loss and a temporary loss of sight in her left eye. In January 2014, in a game with SönderjyskE she suffered another blow to the head that worsened the symptoms.

References

1990 births
Living people
Stella Sigurdardottir
21st-century Icelandic women